Mannophryne cordilleriana is a species of frog in the family Aromobatidae.
It is endemic to Venezuela.
Its natural habitats are subtropical or tropical moist montane forests and rivers.
It is threatened by habitat loss.

References

cordilleriana
Amphibians of Venezuela
Endemic fauna of Venezuela
Taxonomy articles created by Polbot
Amphibians described in 1994